Christian Heritage Party may refer to:
Christian Heritage Party of Canada
Christian Heritage Party of British Columbia
Christian Heritage Party of New Zealand (defunct)